John W. Howe (March 11, 1801November 30, 1873) was a Free Soil and Whig member of the U.S. House of Representatives from Pennsylvania.

Biography
Howe was born in Massachusetts' District of Maine in 1801.  He studied law and was admitted to the bar.  He moved to Smethport, Pennsylvania, and then to Franklin, Pennsylvania, in 1829 and commenced the practice of law.  He also served as justice of the peace.

Howe was elected as a Free Soil candidate to the Thirty-first Congress and reelected as a Whig to the Thirty-second Congress.  He moved to Meadville, Pennsylvania, and later to Rochester, New York, where he died in 1873.  Interment in Greendale Cemetery in Meadville, Pennsylvania.

Sources

The Political Graveyard

1801 births
1873 deaths
People from Maine
Pennsylvania Free Soilers
Free Soil Party members of the United States House of Representatives from Pennsylvania
Whig Party members of the United States House of Representatives from Pennsylvania
Burials at Greendale Cemetery